The New Zealand Derby was a set-weights thoroughbred horse race for three-year-old horses run over a distance of 2400m at Riccarton Racecourse in Christchurch, New Zealand. The inaugural running of the Derby was in 1860, when racing was held at Riccarton Racecourse. 

The race was one of the two main races for three-year-olds in New Zealand, the other being the Great Northern Derby at Ellerslie. The two races were effectively combined into one from 1973, again using the name the New Zealand Derby. However the race was moved from Christchurch to Auckland at Ellerslie Racecourse.  The Great Northern Derby was discontinued. 

Two new 1600m races for three-year-olds were then started in Christchurch, in place of its Derby, the One Thousand and Two Thousand Guineas.

The New Zealand Derby at Riccarton was won by three of the New Zealand Racing Hall of Fame horses Gloaming, Nightmarch and Desert Gold.

Winners

 1860 Ada
 1861 Otto
 1862 Emmeline
 1863 Azucena
 1864 Opera
 1865 Egremont
 1866 Nebula
 1867 Scandal
 1868 Flying Jib
 1869 Manuka
 1870 Envy
 1871 Defamation
 1872 Calumny
 1873 Papapa
 1874 Tadmor
 1875 Daniel O'Rourke
 1876 Songster
 1877 Trump Card
 1878 Natator
 1879 Hornby
 1880 Sir Modred
 1881 The Dauphin
 1882 Cheviot
 1883 Oudeis
 1884 Black Rose
 1885 Stonyhurst
 1886 Disowned
 1887 Maxim
 1888 Manton
 1889 Scots Grey
 1890 Medallion
 1891 Florrie
 1892 Stepniak
 1893 Skirmisher
 1894 Blue Fire 
 1895 Euroclydon
 1896 Uniform
 1897 Multiform
 1898 Altair
 1899 Seahorse
 1900 Renown
 1901 Menschikoff
 1902 Orloff
 1903 Roseal
 1904 Nightfall
 1905 Noctiform
 1906 Zimmerman
 1907 Elevation
 1908 Husbandman
 1909 Elysian
 1910 Danube
 1911 Masterpiece
 1912 Bon Reve
 1913 Cherubini
 1914 Balboa
 1915 Desert Gold
 1916 The Toff
 1917 Estland
 1918 Gloaming (AUS)
 1919 Rossini
 1920 Duo
 1921 Winning Hit
 1922 Enthusiasm
 1923 Black Ronald
 1924 Count Cavour
 1925 Runnymede
 1926 Commendation
 1927 Agrion
 1928 Nightmarch
 1929 Honour
 1930 Cylinder
 1931 Bronze Eagle (AUS)
 1932 Silver Scorn
 1933 Nightly
 1934 Sporting Blood
 1935 Lowenberg
 1936 Wild Chase
 1937 Royal Chief
 1938 Defaulter
 1939 Beaulivre
 1940 Enrich
 1941 Battledress
 1942 Rink
 1943 Tara King
 1944 Pensacola
 1945 Al-Sirat
 1946 Royal Tan
 1947 Liebestraum 
 1948 St. Bruno
 1949 Beaumaris
 1950 The Unicorn
 1951 Dalray
 1952 Programme
 1953 Idaho
 1954 Port Boy
 1955 Syntax
 1956 Passive
 1957 William Paul
 1958 Up and Coming 
 1959 Sol d'Or
 1960 Blue Lodge
 1961 Burgos
 1962 Algalon
 1963 Royal Duty
 1964 Trial Offer 
 1965 Roman Consul
 1966 Fair Account
 1967 Jazz
 1968 Pep
 1969 Piko
 1970 Fairview Lad
 1971 Master John
 1972 Classic Wave

See also

 Thoroughbred racing in New Zealand

References

Horse races in New Zealand
Flat horse races for three-year-olds